Mickey Tucker (born Michael B. Tucker; April 28, 1941) is an American jazz pianist and organist.

Biography 
Tucker was born in Durham, North Carolina in 1941. He grew up in Rankin, Pennsylvania before moving back to North Carolina aged 12. When he was six, he started learning piano, eventually playing in church. While at high school, Tucker played in the school band as well as in a trio that included Grady Tate. Aged 15, Tucker received an early admission scholarship to attend Morehouse College. He became a teacher and taught at a high school in Lake Wales, Florida and Mississippi Valley State College while also performing music.

Tucker left Mississippi in 1964 and moved to New York City. In New York, he performed with Damita Jo, with whom he toured London. He moved on to have stints working with comedian Timmy Rogers, Little Anthony and the Imperials and as organist for James Moody. He entered the jazz world in 1969, working for the next several years with Eric Kloss, Rahsaan Roland Kirk, the Thad Jones/Mel Lewis Orchestra, Eddie Jefferson, and George Benson. He was music director for Art Blakey and the Jazz Messengers. During the 1980s, he appeared on albums by Phil Woods, Art Farmer, Richie Cole, and Benny Golson.

In 1989, Tucker move to Melbourne, Australia. In an interview with Cadence magazine, Tucker explained that he moved to Australia following the murder of two women in his apartment complex in 1987. Tucker's friend, who Tucker says was with him at the time of crime, was accused of the murders. The stress caused by trying to help his friend led him to decide to move to Australia - where his wife was from. 

In Melbourne, Tucker worked at the Victorian College of the Arts' School of Music.

Discography

As leader

 Triplicity (Xanadu, 1975)
 Doublet (Dan, 1976)
 Sojourn (Xanadu, 1977)
 Mister Mysterious (Muse, 1978)
 The Crawl (Muse, 1979)
 Blues in Five Dimensions (SteepleChase, 1989)
 Sweet Lotus Lips (Denon, 1989)
 Hang in There (SteepleChase, 1994)
 Gettin' There (SteepleChase, 1995)

As sideman
With Richie Cole
 New York Afternoon (Muse, 1977)
With Junior Cook
Pressure Cooker (Catalyst, 1977)
The Place to Be (SteepleChase, 1988)
On a Misty Night (SteepleChase, 1989)
You Leave Me Breathless (SteepleChase, 1991)
With Frank Foster
 1968 Manhattan Fever
 1978 Twelve Shades of Black
 1979 Non-Electric Company
 1998 Swing
 2007 Well Water
With Bill Hardman
Home (Muse, 1978)
 What's Up (SteepleChase, 1989)
With Louis Hayes
The Crawl (Candid, 1989)
With Willis Jackson
 1973 West Africa 
 1974 Headed and Gutted 
With Eddie Jefferson
Things Are Getting Better (Muse, 1974)
Still on the Planet (Muse, 1976)
 1999 Vocal Ease
With Rahsaan Roland Kirk
 1971 Blacknuss
 1978 The Vibration Continues
 1999 Left Hook Right Cross
With Eric Kloss
 1974 Essence (Muse)
 1976 Battle of the Saxes (Muse)
With Johnny Lytle
 1980 Fast Hands
 1997 Easy Easy

With the Art Farmer/Benny Golson Jazztet
 Stablemates, Art Farmer/Tommy Flanagan (1979)
 Moment to Moment (Soul Note, 1983)
 Nostalgia (Baystate, 1983) 
 Back to the City (Contemporary, 1986)
 Real Time (Contemporary, 1986 [1988]) 
With Philly Joe Jones
Mean What You Say (Sonet, 1977)
With Archie Shepp
 1978 Live in Tokyo
 1989 Tray of Silver
With George Benson
 1985 Love Walked In
 1985 The Electrifying George Benson
 1987 4 for an Afternoon
 1993 Witchcraft
 1995 Par Excellence
 1998 San Francisco: 1972
 1999 Live: Early Years
 1999 The Masquerade Is Over
 2002 After Hours
 2002 Blue Bossa

With others
 1972 Never Again!,  James Moody
 1973 The New Heritage Keyboard Quartet, Roland Hanna, Mickey Tucker
 1974 Live at Town Hall, Roy Brooks
 1976 Illusions, Jimmy Ponder
 1976 Invitation, David Schnitter
 1977 New Horizons, Charles McPherson
 1978 The Eleventh Day of Aquarius, Ronnie Cuber
 1982 Sentimental Mood, Mickey Bass
 1984 Nostalgia, Benny Golson
 1994 Gentle Time Alone, Ted Dunbar
 1998 Big Daddy, Bob Ackerman
 1998 Richie & Phil & Richie, Richie Cole
 2004 Village in Bubbles, Kazumi Watanabe
 2007 The Crawl: Live at Birdland, Louis Hayes

References

1941 births
Living people
American jazz pianists
American male pianists
SteepleChase Records artists
Muse Records artists
Xanadu Records artists
20th-century American pianists
Jazz musicians from North Carolina
21st-century American pianists
20th-century American male musicians
21st-century American male musicians
American male jazz musicians
The Jazztet members